{{Infobox writer 
| name = Marcus Tullius Cicero
| image = M-T-Cicero.jpg
| caption = 
| birth_date =   January 3, 106 BC
| birth_place = Arpinum, Italy
| death_date =   December 7, 43 BC
| death_place = Formia, Italy
| occupation = Politician, lawyer, orator and philosopher
| nationality = Ancient Roman
| subject = politics, law, philosophy, oratory
| movement = Golden Age Latin
| notableworks = Orations: In Verrem, In Catilinam I–IV, PhilippicaePhilosophy: De Oratore, De Re Publica, De Legibus, De Finibus, De Natura Deorum, De Officiis
}}
The writings of Marcus Tullius Cicero constitute one of the most renowned collections of historical and philosophical work in all of classical antiquity. Cicero was a Roman politician, lawyer, orator, political theorist, philosopher, and constitutionalist who lived during the years of 106–43 BC. He held the positions of Roman senator and Roman consul (chief-magistrate) and played a critical role in the transformation of the Roman Republic into the Roman Empire. He was extant during the rule of prominent Roman politicians, such as those of Julius Caesar, Pompey, and Marc Antony. Cicero is widely considered one of Rome's greatest orators and prose stylists.Haskell, H.J.: This was Cicero (1964) pp. 300–01

Cicero is generally held to be one of the most versatile minds of ancient Rome. He introduced the Romans to the chief schools of Greek philosophy, and also created a Latin philosophical vocabulary; distinguishing himself as a linguist, translator, and philosopher.  A distinguished orator and successful lawyer, Cicero likely valued his political career as his most important achievement. Today he is appreciated primarily for his humanism and philosophical and political writings. His voluminous correspondence, much of it addressed to his friend Atticus, has been especially influential, introducing the art of refined letter writing to European culture. Cornelius Nepos, the 1st-century BC biographer of Atticus, remarked that Cicero's letters to Atticus contained such a wealth of detail "concerning the inclinations of leading men, the faults of the generals, and the revolutions in the government" that their reader had little need for a history of the period.

During the chaotic latter half of the first century BC, marked by civil wars and the dictatorship of Gaius Julius Caesar, Cicero championed a return to the traditional republican government. However, his career as a statesman was marked by inconsistencies and a tendency to shift his position in response to changes in the political climate. His indecision may be attributed to his sensitive and impressionable personality; he was prone to overreaction in the face of political and private change. "Would that he had been able to endure prosperity with greater self-control and adversity with more fortitude!" wrote C. Asinius Pollio, a contemporary Roman statesman and historian.Castren and Pietilä-Castren: "Antiikin käsikirja" /"Handbook of antiquity" (2000) p. 237

A manuscript containing Cicero's letters to Atticus, Quintus, and Brutus was rediscovered by Petrarch in 1345 at the Capitolare library in Verona. This rediscovery is often credited for initiating the 14th-century Italian Renaissance, and for the founding of Renaissance humanism.

Works
Cicero was declared a "virtuous pagan" by the early Church, and therefore many of his works were deemed worthy of preservation. Important Church Fathers such as Saint Augustine and others quoted liberally from his works, e.g. "On the Commonwealth" (De Re Publica) and "On Laws" (De Legibus), as well as Cicero's (partial) Latin translation of Plato's Timaeus dialogue. Cicero also articulated an early, abstract conceptualisation of rights, based on ancient law and custom.

 Speeches 
Of his speeches, eighty-eight were recorded, fifty-two of which survive today.  Some of the items below include more than one speech.

 Legal speeches 

 (81 BC) Pro Quinctio (On behalf of Publius Quinctius)
 (80 BC) Pro Roscio Amerino (In Defense of Sextus Roscius of Ameria)
 (77 BC) Pro Q. Roscio Comoedo (In Defense of Quintus Roscius Gallus the Comic actor)
 (70 BC) Divinatio in Caecilium (Against Quintus Caecilius in the process for selecting a prosecutor of Gaius Verres)
 (70 BC) In Verrem (Against Gaius Verres, or The Verrines)
 (71 BC) Pro Tullio (On behalf of Tullius)
 (69 BC) Pro Fonteio (On behalf of Marcus Fonteius)
 (69 BC) Pro Caecina (On behalf of Caecina)
 (66 BC) Pro Cluentio (On behalf of Aulus Cluentius)
 (63 BC) Pro Rabirio Perduellionis Reo (On behalf of Gaius Rabirius on a Charge of Treason)
 (63 BC) Pro Murena (In Defense of Lucius Licinius Murena, in the court for electoral bribery)
 (62 BC) Pro Sulla (In Defense of Publius Cornelius Sulla)
 (62 BC) Pro Archia Poeta (In Defense of Aulus Licinius Archias the poet)
 (59 BC) Pro Antonio  (In Defense of Gaius Antonius) [lost entire, or never written]
 (59 BC) Pro Flacco (In Defense of Lucius Valerius Flaccus, in the court for extortion)
 (56 BC) Pro Sestio (In Defense of Publius Sestius)
 (56 BC) In Vatinium testem (Against the witness Publius Vatinius at the trial of Sestius)
 (56 BC) Pro Caelio (In Defense of Marcus Caelius Rufus): English translation (56 BC) Pro Balbo (In Defense of Lucius Cornelius Balbus)
 (54 BC) Pro Plancio  (In Defense of Gnaeus Plancius)
 (54 BC) Pro Rabirio Postumo (In Defense of Gaius Rabirius Postumus)
 (54 BC) Pro Scauro (In Defense of Marcus Aemilius Scaurus)

Several of Cicero's speeches are printed, in English translation, in the Penguin Classics edition Murder Trials. These speeches are included:
 In defence of Sextus Roscius of Ameria (This is the basis for Steven Saylor's novel Roman Blood.)
 In defence of Aulus Cluentius Habitus In defence of Gaius Rabirius"
 Note on the speeches in defence of Caelius and Milo
 In defence of King Deiotarus

Political speeches 
Early career (before exile)
 (66 BC) Pro Lege Manilia or De Imperio Cn. Pompei (in favor of the Lex Manilia, or on the command of Pompey)
 (64 BC) In Toga Candida (Denouncing candidates for the consulship of 63 BC)
 (63 BC) De Lege Agraria contra Rullum (Opposing the Agrarian Law proposed by Rullus)
 (63 BC) In Catilinam I-IV (Catiline Orations or Against Catiline)
 (59 BC) Pro Flacco (In Defense of Flaccus)

Mid career (between exile and Caesarian Civil War)
 (57 BC) Post Reditum in Quirites (To the Citizens after his recall from exile)
 (57 BC) Post Reditum in Senatu (To the Senate after his recall from exile)
 (57 BC) De Domo Sua (On his House)
 (57 BC) De Haruspicum Responsis (On the Responses of the Haruspices)
 (56 BC) De Provinciis Consularibus (On the Consular Provinces)
 (55 BC) In Pisonem (Against Piso)
 (52 BC) Pro Milone (In Defence of Titus Annius Milo)

Late career
 (46 BC) Pro Marcello (On behalf of Marcellus)
 (46 BC) Pro Ligario (On behalf of Ligarius before Caesar)
 (46 BC) Pro Rege Deiotaro (On behalf of King Deiotarus before Caesar)
 (44 BC) Philippicae (consisting of the 14 philippics, Philippica I–XIV, against Marcus Antonius)
(The Pro Marcello, Pro Ligario, and Pro Rege Deiotaro are collectively known as "The Caesarian speeches").

Rhetoric and politics 
 (84 BC) De Inventione (About the composition of arguments)
 (55 BC) De Oratore ad Quintum fratrem libri tres (On the Orator, three books for his brother Quintus)
 (54 BC) De Partitionibus Oratoriae (About the subdivisions of oratory)
 (52 BC) De Optimo Genere Oratorum (About the Best Kind of Orators)
 (51 BC) De Re Publica (On the Republic, also known as "On the Commonwealth", and referred to as such, above)
 (46 BC) Brutus (For Brutus, a short history of Roman rhetoric and orators dedicated to Marcus Junius Brutus)
 (46 BC) Orator ad M. Brutum (About the Orator, also dedicated to Brutus)
 (44 BC) Topica (Topics)
 (?? BC) De Legibus (On the Laws)
 (?? BC) De Consulatu Suo (On his consulship – epic poem about Cicero's own consulship, fragmentary)
 (?? BC) De temporibus suis (His Life and Times) – epic poem, entirely lost

Philosophy 

 (89 BC?) Translation of Aratus' Φαινόμενα (Aratea)
(46 BC) Paradoxa Stoicorum (Stoic Paradoxes)
 (45 BC) Hortensius
 (45 BC) Academica Priora – (First edition of the Academica comprising two books, the Catullus, which is lost, and the extant Lucullus) - a book about Academic Skepticism, the school of philosophy of which Cicero was an adherent. 
 (45 BC) Academica Posteriora or Academica Liberi (Second edition of the Academica comprising four books, all of which except for part of book 1 has been lost. Also known as the Varro)
 (45 BC) Consolatio (Consolation) (see Consolatio)
 (45 BC) De Finibus Bonorum et Malorum (About the Ends of Goods and Evils) – a book on ethics
 (45 BC) Tusculanae Quaestiones (Questions debated at Tusculum)
(45 BC) Translation of Plato's Timaeus (sections 27d - 47b)
(? BC) Translation of Plato's Protagoras - testimonia quoted in Priscian, Jerome, and Donatus
 (45 BC) De Natura Deorum (On the Nature of the Gods)
 (45 BC) De Divinatione (On Divination)
 (45 BC) De Fato (On Fate)
 (44 BC) Cato Maior de Senectute (Cato the Elder on Old Age)
 (44 BC) Laelius de Amicitia (Laelius on Friendship)
 (44 BC) De Officiis (On Duties)

Letters 
Cicero's letters to and from various public and private figures are considered some of the most reliable sources of information for the people and events surrounding the fall of the Roman Republic. While 37 books of his letters have survived into modern times, 35 more books were known to antiquity that have since been lost. These included letters to Caesar, to Pompey, to Octavian, and to his son Marcus.

Epistulae ad Atticum (Letters to Atticus; 68–43 BC)
Epistulae ad Brutum (Letters to Brutus; 43 BC)
Epistulae ad Familiares (Letters to friends; 62–43 BC)
Epistulae ad Quintum Fratrem (Letters to his brother Quintus; 60/59–54 BC)

Spurious works 
Several works extant through having been included in influential collections of Ciceronian texts exhibit such divergent views and styles that they have long been agreed by experts not to be authentic works of Cicero. They are also never mentioned by Cicero himself, nor any of the ancient critics or grammarians who commonly refer to and quote passages from Cicero's authentic works.

 (late 80s BC) Rhetorica ad Herennium (authored by a pro-Marian orator of the mid to late 80s BC sympathetic to the tribune Publius Sulpicius Rufus; perhaps Publius Canutius)
 (60s BC) Commentariolum Petitionis (Note-book for winning elections) (often attributed to Cicero's brother Quintus)

See also

Notes

References

Selected critical editions and translations

Philippics
2003. Ramsay, J. Cicero: Philippics I-II. Cambridge University Press.

2012. Manuwald, G. Cicero, "Philippics" 3-9: Edited with Introduction, Translation and Commentary. Volume 1: Introduction, Text and Translation, References and Indexes. Volume 2: Commentary. De Guyter.

Pro Sestio 
2006. Kaster, R.A. Cicero: Speech on Behalf of Publius Sestius. Oxford University Press.

Selected Orations 
1993. Gotoff. H. Cicero's Caesarian Speeches: A Stylistic Commentary. University of North Carolina Press.2009. Zetzel. J. Marcus Tullius Cicero: Ten Speeches. Hackett Publishing.

2001. Siani-Davies. M. Cicero's Speech Pro Rabirio Postumo. Clarendon Press.

2011. Gildenhard. I. Cicero, Against Verres, 2.1.53-86: Latin Text with Introduction, Study Questions, Commentary and English Translation. Open Book Publishers.

De Re Publica 
1928. De Re Publica, De Legibus. Cambridge: Harvard University Press. Loeb Classical Library. Latin text and English translation by Clinton Walker Keyes.

1980. Bréguet, E. La République. Paris: Belles Lettres. Collection des universités de France. (2 volumes).

1984. Büchner, K. De Re Publica. Heidelberg: Winter. Wissenschaftliche Kommentare zu griechischen und lateinischen Schriftstellern.

1995. Zetzel, J. De Re Publica. Selections. Cambridge: Cambridge University Press. Edited with Introduction and Commentary.

2006. Powell. J.G.F. De Re Publica, De Legibus, Cato Maior De Senectute, Laelius De Amicitia. New York: Oxford University Press.

2008. Powell J. and N. Rudd.The Republic, the Laws. New York: Oxford University Press. Oxford World's Classics.

2010. Nickel. R. Der Staat = De Re Publica. Düsseldorf: Artemis & Winkler. Lateinisch-Deutsch.

De legibus 
1928. Keyes. C.W. De Re Publica, De Legibus. Cambridge: Harvard University Press. Loeb Classical Library.

1959. Plinval. G de.Traité Des Lois. Paris Belles Lettres. Collection des universités de France.

1972. Kenter, L. P. De Legibus. A Commentary on Book I. Amsterdam: Hakkert. By L. P. Kenter. Translation from the Dutch by Margie L. Leenheer-Braid.

1983. Giraret, K. M. Die Ordnung Der Welt. Ein Beitrag Zur Philosophischen Und Politischen Interpretation Von Ciceros Schrift De Legibus. Wiesbaden: Franz Steiner.

1994. Nickel, R. De Legibus = Über Die Gesetze; Paradoxa Stoicorum = Stoische Paradoxien. Zürich: Artemis & Winkler. Lateinisch-Deutsch. Herausgegeben.

1999. Zetzel, J. On the Commonwealth; on the Laws. Cambridge: Cambridge University Press.

2004. Dyck, A. A Commentary on Cicero, De Legibus. Ann Arbor: University of Michigan Press.

2007. Sauer, J. Argumentations- Und Darstellungsformen Im Ersten Buch Von Ciceros Schrift De Legibus. Heidelberg: Winter.

2010. Caspar, T. W. Recovering the Ancient View of Founding. A Commentary on Cicero's De Legibus. Lanham: Lexington Books.

Paradoxa Stoicorum 
1971. Molager, J. Les Paradoxes Des Stoïciens. Paris: Belles Lettres. Collection des universités de France.

1991. Ronnick, M. V. Paradoxa Stoicorum. A Commentary, an Interpretation, and a Study of Its Influence. Bern: Peter Lang.

1994. Nickel, R. De Legibus = Über Die Gesetze; Paradoxa Stoicorum = Stoische Paradoxien. Zürich: Artemis & Winkler. Lateinisch-Deutsch. Herausgegeben.

Hortensius 
1958. Ruch, M. L' Hortensius. Paris: Belles Lettres. Collection d'études anciennes.

1962. Grilli, A. Hortensius. Milano: Istituto editoriale Cisalpino.

1976. Staume-Zimmermann, L. Hortensius. Bern: Peter Lang. Europäische Hochschulschriften. Reihe XV, Klassische Philologie und Literatur.

De Finibus Bonorum et Malorum 
1914. Rackham, H. De Finibus Bonorum Et Malorum. Cambridge: Harvard University Press. Loeb Classical Library. Latin text and English translation revised in 1951.

1928. Levy, C. and J. Martha. Des Termes Extrêmes Des Biens Et Des Maux. Paris: Belles Lettres.

1988. Gigon O. and L. Straume-Zimmermann. Über Die Ziele Des Menschlichen Handelns = De Finibus Bonorum Et Malorum. München: Artemis.

1991. Wright, M.R. On Stoic Good and Evil: De Finibus Bonorum Et Malorum, Liber Iii; and Paradoxa Stoicorum. Warminster: Aris & Phillips.

1998. Reynolds, L.D. De Finibus Bonorum Et Malorum: Libri Quinque. New York: Clarendon Press.

2001. Annas, J. and R. Woolf. On Moral Ends. Cambridge: Cambridger University Press.

2005. Moreschini, C. De Finibus Bonorum Et Malorum. Munich: Teubner.

Tusculanae Disputationes 
1927. King, J.E. Tusculanae Disputationes. Cambridge: Harvard University Press. Loeb Classical Library.

1930. Fohlen, G. and J. Humbert. Tusculanes. Paris: Belles Lettres. Collection des universités de France. Tome I: Livres I et II (1930); Tome II. Livre III-V (1931).

1952. Büchner, K. Gespräche in Tusculum. Zürich: Artemis.

1985. Douglas, A.E. Tusculan Disputations. Atlantic Highlands: Humanities Press.

1998. Gigon, O. Gespräche in Tusculum = Tusculanae Disputationes. München: Artemis und Winkler.

2002. Graver, M. Cicero on the Emotions. Tusculan Disputations 3 and 4. Chicago: University of Chicago Press.

2006. Koch, B. Philosophie Als Medizin Für Die Seele. Untersuchungen Zu Ciceros Tusculanae Disputationes. Stuttgart: Steiner.

2007. Gildenhard, I. Paideia Romana. Cicero's Tusculan Disputations. Cambridge: Cambridge Philological Society.

2008. Eckhard, L. Philosophie Unter Der Tyrannis. Ciceros Tusculanae Disputationes. Heidelberg: Winter.

Academica 
1970. Ruch, M. Academica Posteriora. Liber Primus. Paris: Presses Universitaires de France. Érasme.

1988. Hunt, T. J. A Textual History of Cicero's Academici Libri. Leiden: Brill.

1995.  Schäublin, C. Akademische Abhandlungen. Lucullus. Hamburg: F. Meiner. Einleitung von Andreas Graeser und Christoph Schäublin. Anmerkungen von Andreas Bächli und Andreas Graeser.

1998. Haltenhoff, A. Kritik Der Akademischen Skepsis. Ein Kommentar Zu Cicero, Lucullus 1-62. Bern: Peter Lang.

2006. Brittain, C. On Academic Scepticism. Indianapolis: Hackett.

Translation of Plato's Timaeus 
1908. Plasberg, O. M. Tulii Ciceronis Paradoxa stoicorum, Academicorum, Reliquiae cum Lucullo, Timaeus, ND, De divinatione, De fato. Leipzig. (Online publication of the 1908 text, 2011).

1975. Giomini, R. (ed.) De Divinatione, De Fato, Timaeus. Teubner. Leipzig.

De Natura Deorum 
1933. Rackham, H. De Natura Deorum; Academica. Cambridge: Harvard University Press. Loeb Classical Library.

1955. Pease, A.S. De Natura Deorum. Cambridge: Harvard University Press. Two volumes: 1 (1955), 2 (1958). Reprint: New York, Arno Press, 1979.

1986. van den Bruwaene, M. De Natura Deorum: Tables. Latomus no. 192:1–173.

1996. Gigon O. und L. Straume-Zimmermann Vom Wesen Der Götter: Lateinisch-Deutsch. Zürich: Artemis und Winkler.

1997. Walsh, P.G. The Nature of the Gods. New York: Oxford University Press.

2002.  Auvray-Assayas, C. La Nature Des Dieux. Paris: Belles Lettres.

2003. Dyck, A. De Natura Deorum. Liber I. Cambridge: Cambridge University Press.

De Divinatione 
1920. Pease, A.S. De Divinatione; Liber Primvs-Secvndvs. Urbana: University of Illinois.Two volumes: 1 (1920); 2 (1923). Reprint: New York, Arno Press, 1979.

1923. Falconer, W.A. De Senectute; De Amicitia; De Divinatione. Cambridge: Harvard University Press. Loeb Classical Library.

1991.  Schäublin, C. Über Die Wahrsagung = De Divinatione : Lateinisch-Deutsch. München: Artemis und Winkler.

1992. Freyburger, G. and J. Scheid. De La Divination. Paris: Belles Lettres.

2004. Kany-Turpin, J. De La Divination = De Divinatione. Paris: Flammarion.

2006. De François, G. Le De Diuinatione De Cicéron Et Les Théories Antiques De La Divination. Bruxelles: Éditions Latomus.

2006. Wardle, D. Cicero on Divination. De Divinatione, Book 1. New York: Oxford University Press.

De Fato 
1933. Yon, A. Traité Du Destin. Paris: Belles Lettres. Collection des universités de France.

1963. Bayer, K. De Fato. Über Das Fatum. Lateinisch-Deutsch. München: Heimeran-Verlag.

1991. Sharples, R.W. On Fate (De Fato) / Cicero. & the Consolation of Philosophy (Philosophiae Consolationis) : Iv.5-7, V / Boethius. Warminster: Aris and Phillips.

2008. Schallenberg, M. Freiheit Und Determinismus. Ein Philosophischer Kommentar Zu Ciceros Schrift De Fato. Berlin: Walter de Gruyter.

De Senectute and De Amicitia (Laelius) 

1876. Müller, C.F.W. and M. Seyffert. Laelius; De Amicita Dialogus. Hildesheim: Georg Olms 1965. Reprografischer Nachdruck der Ausgabe Leipzig, 1876.

1923. Falconer, W.A. De Senectute; De Amicitia; De Divinatione. Cambridge: Harvard University Press. Loeb Classical Library.

1967. Steinmetz, F-A. Die Freundschaftslehre Des Panaitos. Nach Einer Analyse Von Ciceros Laelius De Amicitia. Wiesbaden: F. Steiner.

1972. Ruch, M. De Senectute. Paris: Bordas.

1988. Powell, J.G.F. Cato Maior De Senectute. Cambridge: Cambridge University Press.

1989. Wuilleumier, P. Caton L'ancien (De La Vieillesse). Paris: Belles Lettres. Collection des universités de France.

1990. Powell, J.G.F. On Friendship and the Dream of Scipio. Warminster: Arts and Phillips.

1998. Merklin, H. Cato Maior De Senectute = Cato Der Ältere Über Das Alter. Lateinisch-Deutsch. Stuttgart: Reclam.

De Officiis  
1913. Miller, W. De Officiis. Cambridge: Harvard University Press. Loeb Classical Library.

1965. Testard, M. Les Devoirs. Paris: Belles Lettres. Collection des universités de France. 2 volumes: 1 (1965); 2 (1970).

1967. Higginbotham, J. On Moral Obligation. Berkeley: University of California Press.

1991. Griffin, M.T. and Atkins, M. On Duties. Cambridge: Cambridge University Press.

1994. Winterbottom, M. De Officiis. New York: Oxford University Press.

1995. Kinapenne, C. De Officiis. Index Verborum, Listes De Fréquence, Relevés Grammaticaux. Liège.

1996. Dyck, A. R. A Commentary on Cicero, De Officiis. Ann Arbor: University of Michigan.

2001. Walsh, P.G. On Obligations. New York: Oxford University Press.

2008. Nickel, R. De Officiis = Vom Pflichtgemässen Handel. Lateinisch-Deutsch. Düsseldorf: Artemis und Winkler.

2016. Newton, B. P. Marcus Tullius Cicero: On Duties (Agora Editions). Ithaca: Cornell University Press.

De Inventione 
1949. Hubbell, H.M. De Inventione; De Optimo Genere Oratorum; Topica. Cambridge: Harvard University Press. Loeb Classical Library.

1994. Achard, G. De L'invention. Paris: Belles Lettres. Collection des universités de France.

1998. Nüsslein, T. De Inventione = Über Die Auffindung Des Stoffes ; De Optimo Genere Oratorum = Über Die Beste Gattung Von Rednern. Düsseldorf: Artemis und Winkler.

De Oratore 
1902. Wilkins, A.S. Rhetorica, Tomus I: Libros De Oratore Tres Continens. New York: Oxford University Press.

1948. Rackham. H. and E.W. Sutton. De Oratore [and De Fato; Paradoxa Stoicorum; De Partitione Oratoria]. Cambridge: Harvard University Press. Loeb Classical Library. Contents: I. De Oratore, Books 1–2. II. De Oratore, Book 3. De Fato, Paradoxa Stoicorum, De Partitione Oratoria.

1985. Leeman, D. H. Pinkster, et al. De Oratore Libri Iii. Kommentar. Heidelberg: Winter. Wissenschaftliche Kommentare zu griechischen und lateinischen Schriftstellern. Band 1: Buch I, 1-65 (A. D. Leeman, H. Pinkster, Hein L. Nelson, Edwin Rabbie, 1993); Band 2: Buch I, 166–265, Buch II, 1-98 (A. D. Leeman, H. Pinkster, Hein L. Nelson, Edwin Rabbie, 1985); Band 3: Buch II, 99-290 (A. D. Leeman, H. Pinkster, Hein L. Nelson, Edwin Rabbie, 1989); Band 4: Buch II, 291-367 /Buch III, 1-95 (A. D. Leeman, H. Pinkster, J. Wisse, H. L. Nelson, E. Rabbie, 1996).

2001. May, J.M. and J. Wisse. Cicero on the Ideal Orator (De Oratore). New York: Oxford University Press.

2007. Nüsslein, T. De Oratore = Über Den Redner. Düsseldorf: Artemis & Winkler. Lateinisch-Deutsch.

2008. Yon, A. L'orateur. Du Meilleur Genre D'orateurs. Paris: Belles Lettres. Collection des universités de France.

Brutus 
1885. Sandys, J.E. Ad M. Brutum Orator. Cambridge: Cambridge University Press. Reprint: New York, Arno Press, 1979.

1903. Wilkins, A.S. Rhetorica, Tomus II: Brvtvs; Orator; De Optimo Genere Oratorvm; Partitiones Oratoriae; Topica. New York: Oxford University Press.

1907. Ad M. Brutum Orator. Lipsia: G. Teubner. Bibliotheca Scriptorvm Graecorvm Et Romanorvm Tevbneriana. Recognovit Wilhelm Friedrich.

1962. Hendrickson, G.L. and H.M. Hubbell. Brutus; Orator. Cambridge: Harvard University Press. Loeb Classical Library.

1981. Barwick, K. Brutus. Freiburg: Ploetz. Lateinisch-Deutsch.

Orator, Partitiones Oratoriae 
1903. Rhetorica, Tomus II: Brvtvs; Orator; De Optimo Genere Oratorvm; Partitiones Oratoriae; Topica. New York: Oxford University Press. Scriptorum classicorum bibliotheca Oxoniensis. Recognovit brevique adnotatione critica instrvxit August Samuel Wilkins.

Topica 
1924. Bornecque, H. Divisions De L'art Oratoire, Topiques. Paris: Belles Lettres.

1983. Zekl, H. G. Topik. Lateinisch-Deutsch. Hamburg: F. Meiner.

2003. Reihnardt, T. Topica. New York: Oxford University Press.

Epistulae 
1987. Shackleton-Bailey, D.R. Epistulae ad Atticum. Vol.I: Libri I–VIII (BT 1208, 1987); Vol.II: Libri IX–XVI (BT 1209, 1987)

1988. Shackleton-Bailey, D.R. Epistulae ad Familiares libri I–XVI (BT 1210, 1988)

1988. Shackleton-Bailey, D.R. Epistulae ad Quintum fratrem. Epistulae ad M. Brutum. Commentariolum petitionis. Fragmenta epistolarum  (BT 1211, 1988)

Fragmentary works 
1963. Cooper, C.G. Latin extracts of Cicero on Himself. University of Queensland Press.

1984. Crawford, Jane W. M. Tullius Cicero: The Lost and Unpublished Orations (Hypomnemata Untersuchungen zur Antike und zu Ihrem Nachleben, Heft 80, Vandenhoeck & Ruprecht, Göttingen, 1984) 

1984. Garbarino, G. Fragmenta Ex Libris Philosophicis, Ex Aliis Libris Deperditis, Ex Scriptis Incertis. Milano: Mondadori.

1994. Crawford, Jane W. M. Tullius Cicero: The Fragmentary Speeches, an Edition with Commentary, 2nd edition (American Philological Association, American Classical Studies no. 37, Scholars Press, Atlanta, 1994) 

Penguin Classics English translations

 Cicero
 Selected Political Speeches (Penguin Books, 1969)
 Selected Works: Against Verres I, Twenty-three letters, The Second Philippic against Antony, On Duties III, On Old Age, by Michael Grant (Penguin Books, 1960)
 On Government: Against Verres II 5, For Murena, For Balbus, On the State III, V, VI, On Laws III, The Brutus, The Philippics IV, V, X, by Michael Grant (Penguin Books, 1993)
 Plutarch, Fall of the Roman Republic, Six Lives by Plutarch: Marius, Sulla, Crassus, Pompey, Caesar, Cicero, by Rex Warner (Penguin Books, 1958; with Introduction and notes by Robin Seager, 1972)

Secondary literature
 Atkins, Jed William (2010). "Rights in Cicero's Political Philosophy". American Political Science Association 2010 Annual Meeting.
Bishop, C. (2018) Cicero, Greek Learning, and the Making of a Roman Classic. Oxford.
Ciaceri, E, (1941), Cicerone e i suoi tempi, volume 2, Milan-Genoa. 
Cowell, F.R. (1973) Cicero and the Roman Republic, Penguin Books, Great Britain.
Everitt, Anthony (2001) Cicero: the life and times of Rome's greatest politician. Random House.  
Frier, B.W (1985) The Rise of the Roman Jurists: Studies in Cicero's Pro Caecina. Princeton University Press. 
Gotoff, H.C. (1993) Cicero's Caesarian Speeches: A Stylistic Commentary. University of North Carolina Press. 
Gruen, E.S. (1974) The last Generation of the Roman Republic. University of California Press.
 Haskell, H.J. (1946) This was Cicero. Fawcett publications, Inc. Greenwich, Conn.
Kinsey, T. E. (1980) "Cicero's case against Magnus, Capito and Chrysogonus in the pro Sex. Roscio Amerino and its use for the historian", L'Ant.Classique 49: 173–190.
Manuwald, G. (2004) "Performance and Rhetoric in Cicero's Philippics", Antichthon 38: 51–69.
March, D. A. (1989) "Cicero and the 'Gang of Five'", Classical World 82: 225–234
Powell, J.G.F. (ed.) (1995) Cicero the Philosopher. Oxford University Press.  
Rawson, Elizabeth (1975) Cicero, A portrait. Allen Lane, Penguin Books. 
 Shackleton-Bailey, D R (1992) Onomasticon to Cicero's Speeches, 2nd edition. Teubner, Stuttgart-Leipzig.
Smith, R E  (1966) Cicero the Statesman. Cambridge University Press.
Strachan-Davidson, J. L., (1936) Cicero and the Fall of the Roman Republic, University of Oxford Press, London. 
Taylor, H: (1918) Cicero: A sketch of his life and works. A. C. McClurg & Co., Chicago.

Further reading
 Francis A. Yates (1974). The Art of Memory, University of Chicago Press, 448 pages, Reprint: 
 Taylor Caldwell (1965), A Pillar of Iron, Doubleday & Company, Reprint:

External links

 General:
 Quotes with Cicero's teachings on oratory
 Links to Cicero resources
 University of Texas Cicero Homepage
 "Cicero" article by Edward Clayton in the Internet Encyclopedia of Philosophy
 Works by Cicero:
Latin texts of Cicero's works at University of Zurich's Corpus Corporum 
List of online translations of Cicero's works

Perseus Project (Latin and English): Classics Collection (see: M. Tullius Cicero)
Works by Cicero at the Stoic Therapy eLibrary
Works of Cicero, The Latin Library
 UAH (Latin, with translation notes): Cicero Page
De Officiis, translated by Walter Miller
Cicero's works: text, concordances and frequency list
Critical Editions and Translations of the Philosophical Works of Cicero
 Biographies and descriptions of Cicero's time:
 At Project Gutenberg
 Plutarch's biography of Cicero contained in the Parallel Lives
 Life of Cicero by Anthony Trollope, Volume I – Volume II
 Cicero by Rev. W. Lucas Collins (Ancient Classics for English Readers)
 Roman life in the days of Cicero by Rev. Alfred J. Church
 Social life at Rome in the Age of Cicero by W. Warde Fowler
 At Heraklia website
 Dryden's translation of Cicero from Plutarch's Parallel Lives
 At Middlebury College website
 SORGLL:  Cicero, In Catilinam I.1–3, read by Robert Sonkowsky